Tom Degnan (born September 24, 1982 in Bucks County, Pennsylvania) is an American actor. He is best known for his role on One Life to Live as Joey Buchanan from 2010 to 2011. He also appeared in As the World Turns in 2009 as Riley Morgan/Adam Munson. Additional appearances include Handsome Harry, alongside Steve Buscemi, and Little Miss Perfect, alongside Lilla Crawford. In 2013 he played the role of Fire Marshall Rick Kelly in the 10th episode of the 4th season of the CBS police procedural drama Blue Bloods in the episode "Mistaken Identity". He has also played roles in the TV shows Lipstick Jungle, Law & Order, The Unusuals, The Good Wife, White Collar, The Following, Magic City,Bones, Person of Interest, The Michael J. Fox Show, Madam Secretary, and The Sonnet Project. In 2013 he played the role of Chris Van Helsing in the made-for-TV movie Gothica and played the role of Matt in the 2014 made-for-TV movie Tin Man. In 2015 he played the role of Jim in the romance-drama film To Whom It May Concern and played the role of Tom in the short story drama film Seclusion. Degnan also had a recurring role on CBS' Limitless. He is a graduate of the MFA Acting program at Case Western Reserve University

Personal life
Degnan married fellow actor Erin Cummings on July 2, 2016, with the ceremony taking place at the Basilica of the University of Notre Dame, Indiana. Together they have one son - Thomas Francis Degnan IV - born via surrogacy in November 2021.

Filmography

References

External links 
 

American male television actors
American male soap opera actors
Living people
Place of birth missing (living people)
21st-century American male actors
1982 births